Sahamalaza National Park is in the northwestern part of Madagascar in Sofia region, with 26035 hectares.

Geography
It is situated near Ambanja in the Ambanja District (Diana Region) and Analalava (Sofia region).

Species
Blue-eyed black lemur, Northern giant mouse lemur, Sahamalaza sportive lemur, Boophis ankarafensis.

See also
 List of national parks of Madagascar
 Fauna of Madagascar

external Links
 www.ecologie.gov.mg

References

Protected areas established in 2007
National parks of Madagascar
Diana Region
Sofia Region
2007 establishments in Madagascar
Ramsar sites in Madagascar
Madagascar dry deciduous forests
Important Bird Areas of Madagascar